The Electoral Commission SA is an independent office which forms part of the Government of South Australia, and which conducts parliamentary state elections every four years.

History 
In 1907 the then State Electoral Department was established to administer all South Australian parliamentary elections. It was renamed to State Electoral Office in 1993, and to Electoral Commission SA in 2009.

More than 120 parliamentary elections, by-elections and referendums have been conducted by this Office. The State Electoral Commissioner was first empowered to conduct miscellaneous elections in 1980, and later in 1990 the Attorney-General gave approval for the Commissioner to be appointed returning officer for local government elections when requested. In 1999 the Electoral Commissioner was appointed returning officer for all local government elections.

The Commission was the first electoral administration in the world to use computer technology to produce an electoral roll, the first prototype roll scanner, and the development and use of cardboard ballot boxes and voting compartments.

Since 2017, the electoral commissioner has been Mick Sherry. For the previous decade, the electoral commissioner was Kay Mousley, who was the first woman in the role.

Redistributions

Redistributions are handled by the South Australian Electoral Districts Boundaries Commission.

See also

Elections in Australia

References

South Australia
Elections in South Australia
Government agencies of South Australia